Yanik Tepe  is a Chalcolithic and Bronze Age archaeological site in East Azarbaijan, Iran.

Site description 

The site is located in Tabriz city in IRAN, east of Lake Urmia and about 30 kilometers southwest of the city of Tabriz.

Yanik Tepe is a relatively large tell (8 hectares) that rises 16.6 meters above the surrounding plain. Excavations at Yanik Tepe were conducted by Charles A. Burney from 1960 to 1962. His excavations revealed a sequence spanning the Chalcolithic (4th millennium BC) to the Early Bronze Age (3rd millennium BC).

The Early Transcaucasian II-III culture flourished around the northern half of the Lake Urmia basin during the 3rd millennium BC. Yanik Tepe is one of the sites that yield clear evidence for this culture.

Bone object 
A bone object found in the Bronze Age layers of the site was originally interpreted by Burney as an amulet. In 2011, ophthalmologist Sahihi Oskooei claimed that it was instead the world's oldest eyewear, made to correct optical problems. Similar objects have been found in excavations at Çatalhöyük, where they may have been used as belt hooks.

References

Archaeological sites in Central Anatolia
Chalcolithic sites of Asia
Bone products
Archaeological sites in Iran
Prehistoric archaeological sites